Some inhabited places in Grevena Prefecture of Greece were previously known by different names. Some of the name forms are identifiably of Greek origin, others of Slavic, yet others of Turkish or more obscure origins.  Following the First World War and the Graeco-Turkish War which followed, the Greek government undertook a renaming program to place Greek names first on places with Turkophonic, and later on those with Slavophonic names.

References

External links
  List compiled by the Institute for Neohellenic Research

Grevena (regional unit)
Grevena